Pigmalião 70 is a Brazilian telenovela produced and broadcast by TV Globo. It premiered on 2 March 1970 and ended on 24 October 1970, with a total of 204 episodes. It's the seventh "novela das sete" to be aired at the timeslot. It is created by Vicente Sesso and directed by Régis Cardoso.

Cast

References

External links 
 

1970 telenovelas
TV Globo telenovelas
Brazilian telenovelas
1970 Brazilian television series debuts
1970 Brazilian television series endings
Portuguese-language telenovelas